In mathematics, a Green's function is the impulse response of an inhomogeneous linear differential operator defined on a domain with specified initial conditions or boundary conditions.

This means that if  is the linear differential operator, then

 the Green's function  is the solution of the equation , where  is Dirac's delta function;
 the solution of the initial-value problem  is the convolution.

Green's functions are named after the British mathematician George Green, who first developed the concept in the 1820s. In the modern study of linear partial differential equations, Green's functions are studied largely from the point of view of fundamental solutions instead.

Under many-body theory, the term is also used in physics, specifically in quantum field theory, aerodynamics, aeroacoustics, electrodynamics, seismology and statistical field theory, to refer to various types of correlation functions, even those that do not fit the mathematical definition. In quantum field theory, Green's functions take the roles of propagators.

Definition and uses
A Green's function, of a linear differential operator  acting on distributions over a subset of the Euclidean space , at a point , is any solution of

where  is the Dirac delta function. This property of a Green's function can be exploited to solve differential equations of the form

However, in practice, some combination of symmetry, boundary conditions and/or other externally imposed criteria will give a unique Green's function. Green's functions may be categorized, by the type of boundary conditions satisfied, by a Green's function number. Also, Green's functions in general are distributions, not necessarily functions of a real variable.

Green's functions are also useful tools in solving wave equations and diffusion equations. In quantum mechanics, Green's function of the Hamiltonian is a key concept with important links to the concept of density of states.

The Green's function as used in physics is usually defined with the opposite sign, instead. That is,

This definition does not significantly change any of the properties of Green's function due to the evenness of the Dirac delta function.

In this case, Green's function is the same as the impulse response of linear time-invariant system theory.

Motivation

Because the operator  is linear and acts only on the variable  (and not on the variable of integration ), one may take the operator  outside of the integration, yielding

This means that

is a solution to the equation 

Thus, one may obtain the function  through knowledge of the Green's function in equation () and the source term on the right-hand side in equation (). This process relies upon the linearity of the operator .

In other words, the solution of equation (), can be determined by the integration given in equation (). Although  is known, this integration cannot be performed unless  is also known. The problem now lies in finding the Green's function  that satisfies equation (). For this reason, the Green's function is also sometimes called the fundamental solution associated to the operator .

Not every operator  admits a Green's function. Aside from the difficulties of finding a Green's function for a particular operator, the integral in equation () may be quite difficult to evaluate. However the method gives a theoretically exact result.

Such an integral equation is known as a Fredholm integral equation, the study of which constitutes Fredholm theory.

Green's functions for solving inhomogeneous boundary value problems
The primary use of Green's functions in mathematics is to solve non-homogeneous boundary value problems. In modern theoretical physics, Green's functions are also usually used as propagators in Feynman diagrams; the term Green's function is often further used for any correlation function.

Framework
Let  be the Sturm–Liouville operator, a linear differential operator of the form

and let  be the vector-valued boundary conditions operator

Let  be a continuous function in  Further suppose that the problem

Theorem
There is one and only one solution  that satisfies

and it is given by

where  is a Green's function satisfying the following conditions:
 For , .
 For , .
 Derivative "jump": .
 Symmetry: .

Advanced and retarded Green's functions

Green's function is not necessarily unique since the addition of any solution of the homogeneous equation to one Green's function results in another Green's function. Therefore if the homogeneous equation has nontrivial solutions, multiple Green's functions exist. In such cases, any linear combination of the two Green's functions is also a valid Green's function. The terminology advanced and retarded is especially useful when the variable x corresponds to time. In such cases, the solution provided by the use of the retarded Green's function depends only on the past sources and is causal whereas the solution provided by the use of the advanced Green's function depends only on the future sources and is acausal. In these problems, it is often the case that the causal solution is the physically important one. The use of advanced and retarded Green's function is especially common for the analysis of solutions of the inhomogeneous electromagnetic wave equation.

Finding Green's functions

Units
While it doesn't uniquely fix the form the Green's function will take, performing a dimensional analysis to find the units a Green's function must have is an important sanity check on any Green's function found through other means. A quick examination of the defining equation,

This leads to the relationship:

For example, if  and time is the only variable then:

If , the d'Alembert operator, and space has 3 dimensions then:

Eigenvalue expansions
If a differential operator  admits a set of eigenvectors  (i.e., a set of functions  and scalars  such that  ) that is complete, then it is possible to construct a Green's function from these eigenvectors and eigenvalues.

"Complete" means that the set of functions  satisfies the following completeness relation,

Then the following holds,

where  represents complex conjugation.

Applying the operator  to each side of this equation results in the completeness relation, which was assumed.

The general study of Green's function written in the above form, and its relationship to the function spaces formed by the eigenvectors, is known as Fredholm theory.

There are several other methods for finding Green's functions, including the method of images, separation of variables, and Laplace transforms.

Combining Green's functions

A further identity follows for differential operators that are scalar polynomials of the derivative, . The fundamental theorem of algebra, combined with the fact that  commutes with itself, guarantees that the polynomial can be factored, putting  in the form:

This process yields identities that relate integrals of Green's functions and sums of the same. For example, if  then one form for its Green's function is:

While the example presented is tractable analytically, it illustrates a process that works when the integral is not trivial (for example, when  is the operator in the polynomial).

Table of Green's functions
Where time appears in the first column, the retarded (causal) Green's function is listed.

Green's functions for the Laplacian
Green's functions for linear differential operators involving the Laplacian may be readily put to use using the second of Green's identities.

To derive Green's theorem, begin with the divergence theorem (otherwise known as Gauss's theorem),

Let  and substitute into Gauss' law.

Compute  and apply the product rule for the ∇ operator,

Plugging this into the divergence theorem produces Green's theorem,

Suppose that the linear differential operator  is the Laplacian, ∇2, and that there is a Green's function  for the Laplacian. The defining property of the Green's function still holds,

Let  in Green's second identity, see Green's identities.  Then,

Using this expression, it is possible to solve Laplace's equation ∇2φ(x) = 0 or Poisson's equation ∇2φ(x) = −ρ(x), subject to either Neumann or Dirichlet boundary conditions. In other words, we can solve for φ(x) everywhere inside a volume where either (1) the value of φ(x) is specified on the bounding surface of the volume (Dirichlet boundary conditions), or (2) the normal derivative of φ(x) is specified on the bounding surface (Neumann boundary conditions).

Suppose the problem is to solve for φ(x) inside the region. Then the integral

reduces to simply φ(x) due to the defining property of the Dirac delta function and we have

This form expresses the well-known property of harmonic functions, that if the value or normal derivative is known on a bounding surface, then the value of the function inside the volume is known everywhere.

In electrostatics, φ(x) is interpreted as the electric potential,  ρ(x) as electric charge density, and the normal derivative  as the normal component of the electric field.

If the problem is to solve a Dirichlet boundary value problem, the Green's function should be chosen such that G(x,x′)  vanishes when either x or x′ is on the bounding surface. Thus only one of the two terms in the surface integral remains. If the problem is to solve a Neumann boundary value problem, it might seem logical to choose Green's function so that its normal derivative vanishes on the bounding surface.  However, application of Gauss's theorem to the differential equation defining the Green's function yields

meaning the normal derivative of G(x,x′)  cannot vanish on the surface, because it must integrate to 1 on the surface.

The simplest form the normal derivative can take is that of a constant, namely 1/S, where S is the surface area of the surface. The surface term in the solution becomes

where  is the average value of the potential on the surface.  This number is not known in general, but is often unimportant, as the goal is often to obtain the electric field given by the gradient of the potential, rather than the potential itself.

With no boundary conditions, the Green's function for the Laplacian (Green's function for the three-variable Laplace equation) is

Supposing that the bounding surface goes out to infinity and plugging in this expression for the Green's function finally yields the standard expression for electric potential in terms of electric charge density as

Example
Find the Green function for the following problem, whose Green's function number is X11:

First step: The Green's function for the linear operator at hand is defined as the solution to

If , then the delta function gives zero, and the general solution is

For , the boundary condition at  implies

For , the boundary condition at  implies

To summarize the results thus far:

Ensuring continuity in the Green's function at  implies

Note that we only integrate the second derivative as the remaining term will be continuous by construction.

So Green's function for this problem is:

Further examples
 Let  and let the subset be all of R. Let  be .
 Let  and let the subset be the quarter-plane  and  be the Laplacian. Then the X10Y20 Green's function is 
 Let , and all three are elements of the real numbers. Then, for any function  with an -th derivative that is integrable over the interval :  The Green's function in the above equation, is not unique.

See also

 Bessel potential
 Discrete Green's functions – defined on graphs and grids
 Impulse response – the analog of a Green's function in signal processing
 Transfer function
 Fundamental solution
 Green's function in many-body theory
 Correlation function
 Propagator
 Green's identities
 Parametrix
 Volterra integral equation
 Resolvent formalism
 Keldysh formalism
 Spectral theory
 Multiscale Green's function

Footnotes

References

 
 Chapter 5 contains a very readable account of using Green's functions to solve boundary value problems in electrostatics.
 
 
 
 
 
 
 

 V.D. Seremet: ”Handbook of Green's Functions and Matrices”, WIT Press, ISBN 978-1-85312-933-9 (2002).

External links
 
 
 
 
 
 Introduction to the Keldysh Nonequilibrium Green Function Technique by A. P. Jauho
 Green's Function Library
 Tutorial on Green's functions
 Boundary Element Method (for some idea on how Green's functions may be used with the boundary element method for solving potential problems numerically)
 At Citizendium
 MIT video lecture on Green's function
 

Differential equations
Generalized functions
Equations of physics
Mathematical physics
Schwartz distributions